John Ching'andu (born 11 December 1993) is a Zambian footballer who plays as a midfielder for ZESCO United F.C. and the Zambia national football team.

Career

Club
Ching'andu is a graduate of the ZESCO United youth system. During the 2021–22 season, he was the club's top scorer with nine goals and was voted the players' player of the year.

International
Ching'andu made his senior international debut on 6 July 2012, tallying 45 minutes before being subbed off for Kasongo Mwepya in a 1-0 friendly defeat to Malawi. In 2015, Ching'andu was a part of the Zambia U23 squad that competed in the Africa U-23 Cup of Nations, making one appearance, a 66-minute stint off the bench in a 2-1 group stage defeat to Tunisia. He was also included in Zambia's squad for the 2018 COSAFA Cup, appearing in all three matches against Namibia, Madagascar, and Zimbabwe as they finished runners-up.

Career statistics

International

Honors

International
Zambia
COSAFA Cup Runner-Up: 2018

References

External links

John Ching'andu at Sofa Score

1993 births
Living people
ZESCO United F.C. players
Zambia Super League players
Zambian footballers
Zambia international footballers
Association football midfielders